The Basketball League Belgium Division I steals title is awarded to the player with the highest steals per game average in a given regular season of the Basketball League Belgium Division I.

Leaders

References

External links
Ethias League seasons at Eurobasket.com

steals